Andrew Leslie & Co, Hebburn  was a shipbuilding company that was started in 1853 on an 8-acre site at Hebburn Quay, Newcastle upon Tyne. The company later merged with the locomotive manufacturer R and W Hawthorn to create Hawthorn Leslie and Company in 1886, when the founder Andrew Leslie retired.

Between 1854 and 1885 the ship yard built 255 vessels. and in 1866 constructed a dry dock, which exists till present day. The company employed around 2600 men, with more jobs in ancillary trades. By 1886, the company later merged with the locomotives company R. and W. Hawthorn, forming the Hawthorn Leslie & Company.

Ships built 

In total company built 258 ships. 
Some of the better-known ships built by Andrew Leslie & Co include: 
, chemical and oil product tanker, completed in 1879 for Bell & Symonds, London.
, cargo steamship, completed in 1879 for JD Milburn, Newcastle.
, chemical and oil product tanker, completed in 1881 for Bell & Symonds, London.

References 

British companies established in 1853
Manufacturing companies established in 1853
1853 establishments in England
Defunct shipbuilding companies of England
Companies based in Newcastle upon Tyne